{{Infobox religious biography
| religion           = Islam
| era                = Modern era
| image              = Fadel al-Maliki 2.jpg
| caption            = Ayatollah Fadhil al-Maliki
| image_size         = 225px
| name               = Fadhil al-Maliki''
| title              = Grand Ayatollah
| birth_date         = 
| death_date         = 
| ethnicity          = Arab Iraqi
| region             = Iraq
| Maddhab            = Ja`fari
| school_tradition   = 
| main_interests     = 
| notable_ideas      = 
| works              = 
| influences         = Khoei, Baqir al-Sadr
| website            =  www.almaleky.org/index.php
}}
 Grand Ayatollah Fadhil al-Maliki ''' (Arabic:  فاضل المالكي) (born 1953) is an Iraqi Twelver Shi'a Marja.

He has studied in seminaries of Najaf, Iraq under Grand Ayatollah Abul-Qassim Khoei and Mohammad Baqir al-Sadr.

See also
List of Maraji

Notes

External links
لقاء مع سماحة آية الله الدكتور الشيخ فاضل المالكي
اية الله الشيخ فاضل المالكي

Iraqi grand ayatollahs
1953 births
Living people
Iraqi Shia Muslims